William Morgan (born 2 October 1944) is a Scottish former professional footballer.

Club career
A winger, Morgan started his career with Burnley, making his first-team debut against Sheffield Wednesday at Hillsborough in 1963. He took over from John Connelly who was transferred to Manchester United and scored his first Burnley goal, when he scored twice in a Boxing Day demolition of Manchester United in a 6–1 win at Turf Moor.

He made his Scotland debut against Northern Ireland at Belfast's Windsor Park in 1967.

He was transferred to Manchester United early in the 1968/9 League season, after Utd's John Aston had broken a leg. He scored 34 goals for United and led them to promotion in 1975 after one season in the Second Division. He played in the World Cup Finals of 1974, which took place in West Germany.

With Steve Coppell's signing in 1975, Morgan lost his place in the Manchester United team and returned to Burnley. His second spell at Turf Moor lasted less than a year. He moved to Bolton Wanderers, enjoying a successful spell at Burnden Park before finishing his career at Blackpool.

Morgan played summers on loan in the North American Soccer League in the late 1970s, playing for the Chicago Sting in 1977 and Minnesota Kicks the following three summers.

During his time at Manchester United, the band Tristar Airbus dedicated the song Willie Morgan on the Wing to Morgan.

International career
Morgan won 26 caps for Scotland, and was selected for their 1974 World Cup squad. His cap tally was increased from 21 to 26 following a decision by the Scottish Football Association in October 2021 to reclassify some tour matches in 1967 as full internationals.

Career statistics

International goals

References

1944 births
Living people
Scottish footballers
Scotland international footballers
Burnley F.C. players
Manchester United F.C. players
Bolton Wanderers F.C. players
Blackpool F.C. players
1974 FIFA World Cup players
North American Soccer League (1968–1984) players
Chicago Sting (NASL) players
Minnesota Kicks players
English Football League players
Scotland under-23 international footballers
Scottish expatriate footballers
Expatriate soccer players in the United States
Association football wingers
Scottish expatriate sportspeople in the United States